Kujawki may refer to the following places:
Kujawki, Greater Poland Voivodeship (west-central Poland)
Kujawki, Łódź Voivodeship (central Poland)
Kujawki, Świętokrzyskie Voivodeship (south-central Poland)